Truist Park is a baseball stadium in the Atlanta metropolitan area, approximately 10 miles (16 km) northwest of downtown Atlanta in the unincorporated community of Cumberland, in Cobb County, Georgia. Opened in 2017, it is the home ballpark of Major League Baseball's Atlanta Braves.

The stadium was constructed in a public–private partnership with a project budget of $622 million. Cobb-Marietta Coliseum & Exhibit Hall Authority issued up to $397 million in bonds for the project. The county raised an additional $14 million from transportation taxes and $10 million cash from businesses in the Cumberland Community Improvement District. The Braves contributed the remaining money for the park and The Battery Atlanta. In March 2015, a security filing from Braves owners Liberty Media allotted $672 million for Truist Park and $452 million for The Battery Atlanta, which adds up to a total cost of above $1.1 billion. The Braves will spend $181 million over 30 years to help pay off the county's bonds on the project.

The Braves hosted a soft opening for season ticket holders on March 31, 2017, in a preseason game against the New York Yankees. The first regular season game at the park was held on April 14, 2017, against the San Diego Padres.

SunTrust Banks originally bought naming rights to the stadium in 2014. After a merger in 2020, SunTrust became Truist Financial and the ballpark was renamed.

History

Leaving Turner Field
On November 11, 2013, the Braves announced that the franchise would leave Turner Field for a new park after the 2016 season. Turner Field had been the home of the Braves since the 1997 season. It was originally built as Centennial Olympic Stadium for the 1996 Summer Olympics, but was designed from the ground up to be converted into a baseball-only stadium after the Olympics ended—even though this eliminated the possibility of its use for other events such as track and field. The stadium was owned by the Atlanta-Fulton County Recreation Authority (AFCRA) and leased to the Braves for twenty years. The Braves had full control over the ballpark's operations. Turner Field was a relatively new facility, younger than 13 of the other 29 major league stadiums, but there were numerous issues that led the Braves to seek a new ballpark.

According to vice chairman John Schuerholz, Turner Field needed $350 million in renovations—$150 million for structural upkeep and $200 million to improve the fan experience. Braves executive vice president Mike Plant has stated that capital maintenance would be much less at the new stadium. While Turner Field was designed from the ground up with the Braves in mind, Plant said that it would require higher capital maintenance costs because it was value-engineered for the 1996 Summer Olympics. This has led to higher capital maintenance costs in the long run. Plant estimates that capital maintenance costs at the new stadium will be no more than $80 million after 30 years – less than the $150 million in capital maintenance needed for Turner Field after 17 years.

Braves executives said that fans were unwilling to come to games in Turner Field's later years due to metro Atlanta's infamous traffic congestion. They also claimed that parking around the stadium is inadequate; Turner Field was under-served by about 5,000 parking spaces. In addition, Plant has noted the downtown location "doesn't match up with where the majority of our fans come from." Plant said that while the Braves operated Turner Field, they had no control over the commercial development around the stadium. Other baseball stadiums built in recent years have been accompanied by nearby shopping and entertainment.

According to Plant, the Braves entered talks with the recreational authority to extend the team's original lease in 2013, but those talks broke down. Atlanta mayor Kasim Reed said the city could not afford to support the kind of renovations the Braves desired, especially while already funding a new stadium for the National Football League's Atlanta Falcons (what became Mercedes-Benz Stadium).

Planning
In summer 2013, the Braves and the Cobb County Commission Chairman Tim Lee made a short list of possible locations in Cobb County. The location chosen for the park is next to the highway interchange between Interstate 75 and Interstate 285. The Braves claim the location is "near the geographic center of the Braves' fan base." Braves officials announced that the park's capacity would be 41,149, which is approximately 8,000 fewer than Turner Field.

In January 2017, the Braves announced that the new park would have more than 11,000 parking spaces owned or leased by the organization for game day. This is 2,500 more spaces than were available at Turner Field. The Braves further unveiled plans to launch a private shuttle service that will serve managed parking lots and key points of interest in metro Atlanta. The Braves also announced that Waze, the world's largest community-based traffic and navigation app, will collaborate with the Braves and Cobb to share data and real-time updates with fans and commuters. Truist Park features a designated ride sharing service drop-off/pick-up zone on Windy Ridge Parkway, adjacent to the ballpark.

In order to reduce traffic congestion, the Braves announced that games played Monday through Thursday would start at 7:30 pm. Games at Turner Field started at 7 pm on those days. There are approximately 30,000 parking spaces within  of the stadium.

The baseball stadium occupies  of a  lot, with the remainder of the space devoted to parking, green space, and mixed-use development.

On July 8, 2015, the Braves announced an agreement for Atlanta-based Gas South to remain the official natural gas partner at Truist Park.

The Battery Atlanta

On November 20, 2013, the Braves unveiled plans to build a $400 million entertainment district that will surround the ballpark. The complex, called The Battery Atlanta, contains a mix of shops, dining, living and workspace in the area surrounding the ballpark. It opened in stages starting in 2017.

Design
The Braves chose Populous to design the new ballpark. Populous has designed 19 of the 30 Major League stadiums currently in use including Marlins Park, Target Field, and Yankee Stadium. The Braves picked Populous over HKS, Inc. who served as a consultant for the Braves prior to the selection of Populous.

On May 14, 2014, the Braves released the first renderings of the new stadium. The ballpark has a southeast orientation. Two factors ended up determining the placement of the park: the topography of the land and the location of gas lines on the property. Before the ballpark was built a comprehensive sun study was conducted by the team and designers that determined the orientation would not be an issue. The ballpark cuts back into a rocky hill, where fans will enter at midlevel and then walk down. The relatively tight site led to a design that's higher than the average MLB ballpark, with fans closer to the action than they were at Turner Field. In fact, the last seat in the upper deck is  closer than what it was at Turner.

A key design element is the use of brick. The masonry resembles patterns popular in the Southeast. Braves executive vice president of sales and marketing Derek Schiller says the masonry gives the ballpark's exterior a look of "timelessness." In addition, the Braves decided to use pre-cast stone. Schiller said "It looks custom hand-laid. It's at all of the entryways. It brings the whole scale of the brick way down." According to Schiller, by designing breaks in the masonry like porches, canopies, varying angles and trellises, "it not only creates shade, it also warms the architecture and gives it a different scale."

Earl Santee, Managing Director of Populous, said his team "was very involved with the master planners of the development. The integration of this building (the ballpark) with those other buildings was really crucial to the success of the project." The result was "a fully integrated experience that's never been seen in baseball before."

Construction
On April 16, 2014, Atlanta Braves and Cobb County officials outlined the timetable for the new stadium's construction. Site clearing was scheduled to begin July 15, 2014 and complete by October 13, 2014. However, site clearing started ahead of schedule after the Cobb County commission vote on May 27, 2014. The Atlanta Braves held a formal groundbreaking ceremony on September 16. The ceremony took place at the site near the northwest intersection of Interstates 75 and 285.

In order to start construction three natural gas lines that ran under the property had to be moved. The high cost of moving the gas lines is one of the key reasons the land had not been developed. The cost to move the lines was $14 million. The pipelines were moved to the perimeter. Two of the lines, which run about  underground, are owned by Colonial Pipeline Company, and the third belongs to Atlanta Gas Light Company. The project was completed in early November, 2014.

In November 2014, workers started drilling the holes for the pylons around the outside perimeter of the stadium's footprint. According to the Braves vice president of business operations Mike Plant, phase one of construction for both the stadium and mixed-use development began in November 2014 and included infrastructure for the site, such as sewer, water and electrical systems. The retention walls for the underground service level of the stadium were also built. The underground level will have a few hundred parking spaces for players, team doctors, clubhouse staff and management staff. By May 2015, crews had installed all the caissons to stabilize the foundation. With the caissons complete, the crews began to pour concrete for the decks.

On August 27, 2015, the Atlanta Braves held a ceremony for the first brick laid of 775,000 bricks that made up the main exterior at Truist Park. On hand for the ceremony were dignitaries from the Braves, Cobb County government, and ballpark sponsors. The first brick was laid by Eutis Morris, 83, who laid the first concrete block at Fulton County Stadium and placed the first and last bricks at Olympic Stadium, which later became Turner Field. Also laying bricks were former Atlanta Braves player Hank Aaron and the team's first baseman at the time Freddie Freeman. The team also sealed two time capsules. The capsules included a video of the ballpark ground breaking; parts of the Big Chicken; a 1948 World Series program; dirt from both older stadiums; a baseball signed by the 1995 championship team; and recordings from team broadcasters. These time capsules will be opened when the stadium is demolished.

In June 2016, construction started on a pedestrian bridge to connect SunTrust Park with the Cobb Galleria. The bridge spans Interstate 285. To fund construction, Cobb county used $5 million given by the Cumberland Community Improvement District, about $4.5 million in federal grants, $380,000 from the Atlanta Braves and about $159,000 from a special taxing district in Cumberland created to help fund the new Braves stadium's construction.

In July 2016, the installation of the seats for the new ballpark started. Also, the installation of hundreds of LED lights were installed along the edge of the ballpark's canopy from the right-field foul pole to home plate. Additionally, a large, light-up tomahawk was installed. Meanwhile, the  metal canopy that covers about 60 percent of these seats was completed. In August 2016, the canopy, lights and seating bowl were completed and the last crane remaining on the field area was removed.

In January 2017, most of the exterior work was complete. The team began moving out of Turner Field the day after the Braves' 2016 season ended, storing equipment temporarily at a warehouse. In December 2016, staffers began moving office equipment and furniture into the new ballpark, and on December 19, team employees began moving into their offices. The playing surface itself started to take shape. The drainage and irrigation systems were installed and covered with layers of gravel, sand and soil. The infield, pitcher's mound and warning track were formed in December 2016. The final layer of topsoil for the grass sod was installed in January.

The Braves received the certificate of occupancy for the entire ballpark on February 24, 2017. With seats, video boards and most other elements already installed, the sod was one of the last missing pieces of the new ballpark.

Opening

The 2017 Atlanta Braves season was the team's first in Truist Park. The Atlanta Braves defeated the New York Yankees 8–5 in an exhibition game on March 31, 2017, in their first game in the ballpark.

On January 25, 2017, the Braves announced that the University of Georgia and University of Missouri would play the first baseball game in Truist Park on April 8, 2017. The Georgia-Missouri game was also the first time the stadium was open to the general public. The teams drew in 33,025 spectators as Missouri beat Georgia 6–1. Missouri's Trey Harris hit the first home run.

The Braves' regular-season opener was held on April 14, 2017. During pregame ceremonies, the Braves unveiled the team's 10 retired numbers on a left-field facade, and seven of the 10 individuals represented—Hank Aaron, Bobby Cox, Tom Glavine, Chipper Jones, Dale Murphy, Phil Niekro, and John Smoltz—took part in the festivities. The ceremonial first pitch was thrown by Aaron, with Cox serving as catcher. Aaron had also thrown the ceremonial first pitch for the Braves' first and last games at Turner Field. The Braves would defeat the San Diego Padres 5–2. Braves center fielder Ender Inciarte recorded the first out, first hit, first run, and first home run in the new ballpark.

Changes for the 2018 season

Inside the stadium 16 semicircular tables, each with four swivel chairs, replaced the top six rows of seats in sections 122 and 130, which are along the first-base and third-base lines. The change was made because the 80 four-person tables in the stadium's original design, all on the terrace level, sold out quickly the year prior. The additional dining and kitchen space was gained mostly by eliminating a media interview room.

Outside the stadium the 264-room, 4-star Omni hotel and the Comcast office building, both of which overlook the stadium, opened during the Braves' offseason, adding energy and activity beyond the outfield. Two-dozen shops and restaurants now are open throughout The Battery. The latest addition is "eat-ertainment" concept Punch Bowl Social. About 75% of the available retail and restaurant space in the mixed-use development will be occupied on the Braves' opening day.

The playing field has been resodded, and the plants that struggled in the low-light "Monument Garden" area have been replaced.

Naming rights
In 2014, Atlanta-based SunTrust Banks bought the initial naming rights to the stadium for 25 years. In February 2019, SunTrust Banks announced a merger with BB&T to create what would become Truist Financial; Braves officials stated that the SunTrust Park name would remain in place during the 2019 season. On January 8, 2020, crews began removing SunTrust Park signs from the stadium. On January 14, 2020, the Braves and Truist Financial formally announced that the ballpark's name would change to Truist Park.

Features

Configuration

The ballpark features an intimate configuration, placing a higher percentage of seats in close proximity to the field than any other ball park in Major League Baseball. Braves executive vice president of sales and marketing Derek Schiller stated that the seating bowl is aimed at putting fans closer to the action, not by reducing the amount of foul territory, but with cantilever designs that push the middle and upper bowls toward the field. The existing topography of the property has been integrated into the design. The Braves are using LED lights for the stadium. LED lights provide better quality for fans in the stands and watching on TV. LED lights will also reduce the time it takes to restore lighting in case of a power outage.

Water feature

Inside the ballpark, in the "batter's eye" area just beyond the center-field wall features three evergreen trees. The area includes boulders and a waterfall/water feature nicknamed "Chattahoochee Falls". The green giant arborvitae is a large, vigorous, fast-growing evergreen—shooting up by as much as 3' per year until maturity. The Braves took inspiration from a similar setup in the same area of the Colorado Rockies' Coors Field. A fountain shoots streams of water  into the air, toward the main video board, from the upper pond. The feature comes alive after Braves home runs and wins.

Foul ball protection

The ballpark features an expanded protection from foul balls. The protective netting extends from behind home plate to the far end of both dugouts at Truist Park. Although longer, Truist Park's protective netting isn't quite as high as Turner Field's. Derek Schiller attributed that difference to the geometry of ballpark and where the cables that hold up the screen are secured to stadium structures. From directly behind home plate, the screen extends  down the third-base line and  down the first-base line, according to Braves field director Ed Mangan. Schiller said innovations have made protective screens "thinner but in fact stronger," meaning "we're getting the ability to cover the most number of seats with the least view issues as possible."

Playing surface
The Braves selected a type of grass called "Seashore Paspalum, Platinum TE" for the stadium. The Braves replaced Turner Field's Tifway 419 hybrid Bermuda grass in the infield in 2012 in hopes the softer, thicker paspalum would slow down the playing surface a bit for the benefit of their infielders. The Bermuda remained in Turner Field's outfield, while the grassed areas of foul territory also were switched to paspalum. At Truist Park, the entire field is paspalum. It is a popular choice for beach golf courses. It also is used at Minute Maid Park

Monument Garden and statues

Unlike Turner Field, Truist Park does not have a stand-alone Braves museum. However, a well-appointed space in the main concourse behind home plate, Monument Garden, displays many highlights of franchise history. The Monument Garden features audio, light and water elements. The Braves partnered with Atlanta-based A-R-T & Associates to create a visual experience for Braves fans. The baseball-centric artwork highlights nostalgic moments throughout Braves franchise history. The 300-piece installation consists largely of original artwork ranging from portraits to action scenes, and complemented by macro photography, oversized vintage baseball cards and a LEGO brick mosaic. The Braves took memorabilia from the Ivan Allen Jr. Braves Museum & Hall of Fame at Turner Field and incorporated it throughout the ballpark.

The focal point of Monument Garden is a statue of Hank Aaron. The statue was created and unveiled by Atlanta-based artist Ross Rossin. The statue captures the moment on April 8, 1974, at Atlanta-Fulton County Stadium when Aaron broke Babe Ruth's long-standing 714 career home-run record. Behind the statue is a sculpture made of 755 baseball bats in honor of Aaron's career home-run total. A video screen plays an Aaron biography. Other statues will be placed throughout the stadium. The bat and ball from his 715th home run are displayed in the Hank Aaron Terrace above left field.

On April 13, 2017, the Braves unveiled a statue of former manager Bobby Cox. The new statue joined two other statues outside the ballpark featuring legends of the Braves franchise. The other statues include Warren Spahn and Phil Niekro.

Technology

The stadium is equipped with a Wi-Fi network than on an average gameday can support 10,000-14,000 concurrent users access. The system is robust enough for everyone in a sold-out ballpark to simultaneously post a selfie. On a Friday or Saturday with big crowds, the system reaches 8.3 terabits of data. The stadium features  of single mode fiber optic lines,  of CAT6A lines, and 1,350 802.11ac access points: 900 in the ballpark, 450 in the adjacent Battery. There are 1,350 Panasonic televisions that are installed throughout the ballpark.

Public reaction

Announcement and polls

After the new stadium was announced, citizens organized campaigns both supporting and opposing the plan, which was made public only two weeks before the Cobb County Commission voted. More than 80% of county residents supported delaying the vote. Cobb Chairman Tim Lee and Commissioner Helen Goreham insisted that vote could not be delayed because it would threaten the stadium's timeline.

An InsiderAdvantage/FOX 5 poll released on November 25, 2013, showed that 59% of registered voters in Cobb County favored building a new stadium for the Braves. However, support fell to 30% of Cobb County voters when they were asked if they'd support funding the stadium with Cobb County tax dollars, with 56% opposed and 14% undecided. On September 8, 2014, the University of Florida's Department of Tourism, Recreation and Sports Management released the first independent scientific poll on Cobb residents' attitude toward the public investment in the stadium. The survey found that 55% of the survey respondents would have supported the stadium in a referendum.

Public hearing and vote

Two weeks after the Atlanta Braves announced the new stadium project, the Cobb County Commission held a public hearing to vote on whether to approve the plan. Residents who both supported and opposed the plan began crowding into the meeting hall hours before the 7 p.m. hearing was to begin, many sporting "Cobb: Home of the Braves" T-shirts. After a one-hour public comment on the new stadium project, the Cobb County Commission voted 4–1 to approve a memorandum of understanding with the Atlanta Braves. On May 27, 2014, the Cobb County commissioners voted unanimously, 5–0, on the operating agreement that bound the county to borrow up to $397 million to build the new stadium.

Appeal and aftermath

Retired businessman Larry Savage, attorney Tucker Hobgood, and Austell resident Rich Pellegrino filed notices of appeal with the Georgia Supreme Court, to argue against issuance of the bonds. Attorneys Lesly Gaynor Murray and Blake Sharpton of law firm Butler Snow, the county's bond counsel, represented Cobb in the Supreme Court. The appeal was heard by the Georgia Supreme Court in February, 2015. On June 29, 2015, the Georgia Supreme Court unanimously upheld the bond authorization. The failed appeal represented the last legal challenge to the SunTrust Park project.

In July 2016, Cobb County commissioner Tim Lee lost his bid for re-election to challenger Mike Boyce. Boyce had called the election a delayed referendum on the stadium deal, but Lee pointed to four other commissioners who were re-elected promoting the Braves.

Ballpark reputation

The ballpark opened to positive reviews. Woody Studenmund of the Hardball Times called the park a "gem" and he was impressed with "the compact beauty of the stadium and its exciting approach to combining baseball, business and social activities." J.J. Cooper of Baseball America praised the "excellent sight lines for pretty much every seat." Cooper also noted that "the Wi-Fi works and it's very fast, even with a park full of smartphone users."

For the first half of the opening season many believed that the new ballpark favored hitters. Fox Sports South announcer Chip Caray speculated that the park favored hitters because "it's a vacuum." In May 2017, Braves manager Brian Snitker said, "Everybody is going to like hitting here, not just left-handers." Despite the speculation, Truist Park is slightly favoring pitchers according to MLB park factors.

Other events

Truist Park has also hosted other non-baseball events such as a college football game on November 17, 2018 between Kennesaw State University and Jacksonville State University.  The ballpark has served as a concert venue for numerous musical acts such as Metallica, Red Hot Chili Peppers, and Billy Joel.

See also

 List of Major League Baseball stadiums

References

External links

Official website
Construction Camera
Construction Time-Lapse Video

Buildings and structures in Cobb County, Georgia
Major League Baseball venues
Atlanta Braves stadiums
Braves
Sports in Cobb County, Georgia
Sports venues completed in 2017
Populous (company) buildings
2017 establishments in Georgia (U.S. state)